Bartłomiej Kruczek is a Polish slalom canoeist who competed at the international level from 2002 to 2006.

He won a bronze medal in the C2 team event at the 2002 ICF Canoe Slalom World Championships in Bourg-Saint-Maurice.

References

Living people
Polish male canoeists
Year of birth missing (living people)
Place of birth missing (living people)
Medalists at the ICF Canoe Slalom World Championships